Basketball was one of the many sports which was held at the 1994 Asian Games in Hiroshima, Japan between 3 October and 15 October 1994. China defeated Korea in the men's final en route to their 4th title, while Korea edged host Japan to claim their 2nd title in the women's final.

Medalists

Medal table

Final standing

Men

Women

References
Basketball Results

External links
Men's Results
Women's Results

 
Basketball
1994
1994 in Asian basketball
International basketball competitions hosted by Japan